Ministry of Transport and Channels of Communication is a ministry of the Democratic Republic of the Congo.  Charles Mwando Nsimba is the minister.

The Bureau Permanent d’Enquêtes d’Accidents et Incidents d’Aviation (BPEA "Permanent office of investigations of aviation Accidents/Incidents") of the ministry investigates aviation accidents and incidents. The BPEA is headquartered on the first floor of the Immeuble Zecodiam in Gombe, Kinshasa. The BPEA was created by decree no. 12/035 of 2 October 2012.

See also
 Régie des Voies Aériennes de la République Démocratique du Congo
 United Nations Flight 834 (air accident that took place in the DRC)

References

Transport
Transport organisations based in the Democratic Republic of the Congo
Organizations investigating aviation accidents and incidents
Civil aviation authorities in Africa
DRC